The Family—also called the Santiniketan Park Association and the Great White Brotherhood—is an Australian New Age group formed in the mid-1960s under the leadership of yoga teacher Anne Hamilton-Byrne (born Evelyn Grace Victoria Edwards; 30 December 1921–13 June 2019). The group's headquarters was raided by the police on 14 August 1987 and all children were removed from the premises. In June 1993, Hamilton-Byrne was charged with conspiracy to defraud and to commit perjury by falsely registering the births of three unrelated children as her own triplets, but those charges were eventually dropped.  She pleaded guilty to the remaining charge of making a false declaration and was fined $5,000.

Religious claims
The Family taught an eclectic mixture of Christianity and Hinduism with other Eastern and Western religions on the principle that spiritual truths are universal. The children studied the major scriptures of these religions and also the works of fashionable gurus including Sri Chinmoy, Meher Baba, and Rajneesh. The group has an inner circle who justify their actions by their claim to be reincarnations of the Apostles of Jesus.

The basis of The Family's philosophy was that Hamilton-Byrne was the reincarnation of Jesus Christ and a living god. Jesus was said to be a great master who came down to Earth, and the group believed that Buddha and Krishna were other enlightened beings who similarly came down to help humanity. Hamilton-Byrne was regarded as being in the same category as these teachers. One adopted daughter, Sarah Hamilton-Byrne, later described the group's beliefs as a "hotch-potch" of Christianity and Eastern mysticism.

History

Beginnings
Around 1964, Raynor Johnson was hosting regular meetings of a religious and philosophical discussion group led by Hamilton-Byrne at Santiniketan, his home at Ferny Creek in the Dandenong Ranges on the eastern outskirts of Melbourne. Also connected was a series of weekly talks he gave at the Council of Adult Education in Melbourne, entitled "The Macrocosm and the Microcosm". The group purchased an adjoining property which they named Santiniketan Park in 1968 and constructed a meeting hall, Santiniketan Lodge.

The group consisted of middle class professionals; it has been estimated that a quarter were nurses and other medical personnel and that many were recruited by Johnson, who referred them to Hamilton-Byrne's hatha yoga classes. Members mainly lived in nearby suburbs and townships in the Dandenongs, meeting each Tuesday, Thursday, and Sunday evening at Santiniketan Lodge, Crowther House in Olinda or another property in the area known as the White Lodge.

Newhaven
During the late 1960s and the 1970s, Newhaven Hospital in Kew was a private psychiatric hospital owned and managed by Marion Villimek, a Santiniketan member; many of its staff and attending psychiatrists were also members.

Many patients at Newhaven were treated with the hallucinogenic drug LSD. The hospital was used to recruit potential new members from among the patients, and also to administer LSD to members under the direction of the Santiniketan psychiatrists John Mackay and Howard Whitaker. One of the original members of the Association was given LSD, electroconvulsive therapy, and two leucotomies, also called lobotomies, during the late 1960s.

Although the psychiatric hospital had been closed down by 1992, that year a new inquest was ordered into the death of a Newhaven patient in 1975 after claims that his death had been due to deep sleep therapy. The inquest heard evidence concerning the use of electroconvulsive therapy, LSD, and other practices at Newhaven but found no evidence that deep sleep had been used on this patient. The Newhaven building was later reopened as a nursing home with no connections to its previous owner or uses.

Kai Lama property
Anne Hamilton-Byrne acquired fourteen infants and young children between about 1968 and 1975. Some were the natural children of members of The Family; others had been obtained through irregular adoptions arranged by lawyers, doctors, and social workers within the group who could bypass the normal processes. The children's identities were changed using false birth certificates or deed poll, all being given the surname "Hamilton-Byrne" and dressed alike even to the extent of most of them having their hair being dyed uniformly blonde.

The children were kept in seclusion and home-schooled at Kai Lama, a rural property usually referred to as "Uptop", at Taylor Bay on Lake Eildon near the town of Eildon, Victoria. They were told that Anne Hamilton-Byrne was their biological mother, and knew the other adults in the group as "aunties" and "uncles". They were denied almost all access to the outside world, and subjected to a discipline that included frequent, severe beatings – often for little or no reason – and starvation diets.

The children were frequently dosed with the psychiatric drugs fluphenazine, diazepam, haloperidol, chlorpromazine, nitrazepam, oxazepam, trifluoperazine, carbamazepine, or imipramine. On reaching adolescence they were compelled to undergo an initiation involving LSD: while under the influence of the drug the child would be left in a dark room, alone, apart from visits by Hamilton-Byrne or one of the psychiatrists from the group.

Siddha Yoga
For a few years, Anne Hamilton-Byrne developed a connection to the Siddha Yoga movement, receiving shaktipat initiation from Swami Muktananda and taking the Sanskrit name Ma Yoga Shakti. She took some of the children to stay with Muktananda at his ashram at South Fallsburg, New York (later known as the Shree Muktananda Ashram) in the Catskill Mountains in 1979 and 1981, and purchased a nearby property as her own base in the US.

Sarah Hamilton-Byrne tells how Muktananda would give a private audience (or darshan) once a week to Hamilton-Byrne's group. He once asked the children if they would like to leave The Family and live with him at his Gurudev Siddha Peeth ashram in Ganeshpuri, India. The children all gave an enthusiastic yes, but were later punished by Hamilton-Byrne for disloyalty. She states that Hamilton-Byrne eventually caused a lot of trouble in the Shree Muktananda Ashram, and some of Muktananda's devotees defected to The Family. Sarah was present when Swami Tejomayanand was initiated into The Family; she states that she could not understand why he would want to join a sect where everyone was so miserable, when it seemed that everyone around Muktananda was so happy.

Police intervention
Sarah Hamilton-Byrne was expelled by her adoptive mother in 1987 because of arguing and rebellious behaviour. With the support of a private investigator and others, she then played an instrumental role in bringing The Family to the attention of the Victoria Police. As a result, a raid took place at Kai Lama on Friday, 14 August 1987, and all children were removed from the premises. Sarah later went on to study medicine and became a qualified doctor. She also learned that she had been adopted and eventually met her biological mother.

After the raid in 1987, Anne Hamilton-Byrne and her husband, William, remained outside Australia for the next six years. Operation Forest, an investigation involving police in Australia, the UK, and the US resulted in their arrest in June 1993 by the FBI in the town of Hurleyville in the Catskills in New York. They were extradited to Australia and charged with conspiracy to defraud and to commit perjury by falsely registering the births of three unrelated children as their own triplets, charges that were later dropped. Elizabeth Whitaker, wife of the psychiatrist Howard Whitaker, was their co-defendant. The Hamilton-Byrnes pleaded guilty to the remaining charge of making a false declaration and were fined $5000 each. The conspiracy charges against Whitaker were dropped, but she was convicted of falsely obtaining nearly $23,000 between 1983 and 1987.

Margot MacLellan, aged 64, was convicted of falsely obtaining $28,000 between 1978 and 1988. Joy Travellyn, aged 56, was convicted of falsely obtaining over $38,000 between 1979 and 1988. Helen Buchanan, aged 49, was convicted of falsely obtaining almost $15,000 between 1980 and 1987.

Litigation

In August 2009, two individuals received financial compensation from Anne Hamilton-Byrne after suing her. Her granddaughter, Rebecca Cook-Hamilton, sued her in 2007 for alleged psychiatric and psychological illnesses. She alleged that she received "cruel and inhuman treatment" from Hamilton-Byrne and her servants, including beatings, being locked in a freezing shed overnight and being forced to take medications. She also alleged that she was given insufficient food. Her award was estimated to be $250,000.

A former member of The Family, Cynthia Chan, alleged that she paid the sum of $352,115 to Hamilton-Byrne for real estate in Olinda, Victoria, but the property was never transferred to her. She also alleged that she paid the sum of $70,400 to Hamilton-Byrne for another property, but this too was never transferred to her. Hamilton-Byrne said she had no memory of the matter. Chan's judgement was estimated at $250,000.

In the 1980s, police estimated that Hamilton-Byrne's fortune could be as much as $50 million.

Timeline
1960s: The Family begins recruiting members from patients at Newhaven Clinic and giving them LSD.
1961: Anne Hamilton-Byrne meets Raynor Johnson and they found The Family.
1964: Johnson buys land at Ferny Creek, Victoria and builds Santiniketan Lodge, which becomes the headquarters of The Family.
1965: Hamilton-Byrne marries South African naval officer Michael Riley, but the marriage does not last.
1968: Hamilton-Byrne begins adopting children along with her partner Bill. Both change their name to Hamilton-Byrne but do not marry at this stage.
1970s: Hamilton-Byrne buys Broom Farm in Langton Green, England and a property in the Catskills, New York near Muktananda's ashram. She also marries Bill.
1983: Australian Federal police go to Kai Lama looking for missing girl Kim Halm.
1986: Newhaven closes and is later the subject of a lawsuit brought by relatives of deceased group members. Anne Hamilton-Byrne wins.
1987: Sarah Hamilton-Byrne is expelled by Anne and later talks to police, resulting in raid on Kai Lama. Children are taken away from the property.
1988: Seven female group members are gaoled for social security fraud.
1989: Victorian police establish Operation Forest to investigate The Family.
1990: Former group solicitor Peter Kibby starts cooperating with police and confesses to forging birth records on orders from Hamilton-Byrne. Former "auntie" Patricia McFarlane gives information to police about adoption scams.
1993: Anne and Bill are arrested in the Catskills by the FBI after phone calls are traced to Australia.
1995: Sarah Hamilton-Byrne's book Unseen Unheard Unknown is published by Penguin.
2001: Sarah Hamilton-Byrne visits Bill before he dies. Anne Hamilton-Byrne attends his funeral in her only public appearance since her conviction.
2009: In a spirit of forgiveness, Sarah Hamilton-Byrne takes the initiative in seeing Anne at her compound in Olinda, Victoria.
2013: It is reported that Anne is close to death with dementia in a Melbourne nursing home, and that there is an internal power struggle over Anne's successor as leader of the group. In an interview with ABC Local Radio in Ballarat in response to these reports, Ben Shenton, who had been adopted by The Family at the age of eighteen months, said the group had become a "toothless tiger".
2014: Secret diaries of Raynor Johnson are released to the public that give an authoritative insiders view on how the group started, what its aim was, and how it grew.
2016: The Family documentary is released at the Melbourne International Film Festival; it is produced by Anna Grieve and written, directed, and co-produced by Rosie Jones.
2016: Sarah Hamilton-Byrne dies, aged 46.
2019: Rosie Jones expanded three-episode miniseries, The Cult of the Family, is released in March.
2019: Anne Hamilton-Byrne died at the age of 97 on 13 June.

References

External links

"Why i see Anne" by Dr Sarah Moore/Hamilton-Byrne
Rebuilding Family after Life Behind the Wire in 'The Family' by Ben Shenton formerly Ben Saul Hamilton-Byrne
Anne Hamilton-Byrne Gallery
Website for the 98-minute documentary by Rosie Jones world premiere at MIFF July–August 2016
Website of The Cult of the Family, Rosie Jones's expanded three-episode miniseries
Episodes of Let's Talk About Sects podcast about the Family: "The Family" (featuring Ben Shenton), ""The Family Update" (featuring Chris Johnston), and "David Freeman – Former child member of The Family"

New Age organizations
Yoga organizations
Religious organizations established in 1961
Religious organisations based in Australia
New religious movements